A test tube brush or spout  brush is a brush used for cleaning test tubes and narrow mouth laboratory glassware, such as graduated cylinders, burettes, and Erlenmeyer flasks. It is composed of nylon, synthetic, or animal fur bristles of various diameters lined against a rather sturdy wire handle with a looped end for hanging. The wire can be made from a wide range of metals, such as aluminium, bronze, beryllium, copper, and brass. FDA grade brushes are designed to be resistant to acid and other corrosive chemicals, including aromatic and aliphatic hydrocarbons, ketones, ethyl acetate esters, and trichloroethylene.

Sizes
Test tube brushes come in sizes with the brushes themselves varying from 10–2,000mm in length and 3–200mm in diameter. For example:

Types of brushes

Brushes are designed for the purpose of cleaning test tubes, therefore are developed to be able to reach all corners of the glassware.

Babcock test bottle brush

A Babcock test bottle brush is a specialised test tube brush designed for cleaning bottle neck flasks. It has an extra long radial bristle tip that is flexible enough to enter the narrow neck of various laboratory glassware, and fan out at the bottom of the chamber for efficient cleaning. The middle section of the metal wire handle contains short stemmed bristles that can be used to scrub along the neck of the flask.

Adjustable test tube brush 
The adjustable brush contains a stiff, bendable twisted wire core that forms a loop in the middle, allowing the brush to be adjusted to fit test tubes of various sizes.

See also 
 Brush
 Test tube

References 

Laboratory equipment